Chipman Airport , is located  north of Chipman, Alberta, Canada. It is also known as the "Chipman Gliderport".

The airport is owned and operated by the Edmonton Soaring Club. The club, which was previously operating from the Edmonton/Cooking Lake Airport, purchased the site in 1971, when other plans were being made for Cooking Lake by the Government of Alberta.

Itinerant air traffic is welcome, and should use the aerodrome frequency of 123.4, and keep an eye out for glider traffic. The airport is not maintained in the winter, but is suitable for aircraft on skis when snow-covered. The airport is usually attended on weekends and designated flying weeks during the soaring season, which typically runs from mid-April through October.

Facilities available include a clubhouse with kitchen, bathrooms, and showers; a bunkhouse for overnight accommodation; cable tie-downs; and emergency fuel (100LL). Pilots should call ahead to see if the airport is attended: (780) 363-3860.

See also
 Chipman/M.Y. Airfield

References

External links
Edmonton Soaring Club
Alberta Soaring Council
Soaring Association of Canada
Page about this airport on COPA's Places to Fly airport directory

Registered aerodromes in Alberta
Lamont County
Gliderports in Canada
Gliding in Canada